Robert Lima Fonseca (18 June 1972 – 17 June 2021) was an Uruguayan football player and manager. He played as a defender. He played for Peñarol, Chacarita and Sporting Cristal, among others. With Peñarol he became five times Primera División champion between 1993 and 1997. At the last club he played for, Cerro Largo F.C., he became assistant coach. Being an assistant coach for several clubs between 2008 and 2017 he became manager of Juticalpa in 2019.

Lima died on 17 June 2021, aged 48.

References

External links
 
 

1972 births
2021 deaths
People from Melo, Uruguay
Uruguayan footballers
Association football defenders
Uruguay international footballers
Peñarol players
Chacarita Juniors footballers
Club Olimpia footballers
Sporting Cristal footballers
Liverpool F.C. (Montevideo) players
Cerro Largo F.C. players
Uruguayan Primera División players
Uruguayan football managers
Juticalpa F.C. managers
Place of death missing